PBW  may refer to:

 Philadelphia-Baltimore-Washington Stock Exchange
 Peanut Butter Wolf, American hip hop record producer
 Proton beam writing, a lithography process
 Play by Web, Play-by-post role-playing game
 Prosopography of the Byzantine World, a prosopographical database project
 Poincaré-Birkhoff-Witt theorem, a result in mathematics